Víctor Puente (born 2 September 1941) is a Peruvian rower. He competed in the men's coxless pair event at the 1960 Summer Olympics.

References

1941 births
Living people
Peruvian male rowers
Olympic rowers of Peru
Rowers at the 1960 Summer Olympics
Sportspeople from Lima
20th-century Peruvian people